Never Let Me Go is the eighth studio album by American R&B singer and songwriter Luther Vandross, released on May 26, 1993 in the US by Epic. It was his first studio album not to debut at #1 on the R&B Albums chart.

The album became the third consecutive top-ten album on the Billboard 200 for Vandross, peaking at number six, and was released to mixed to positive reviews, earning Vandross numerous awards and accolades including three Grammy Award nominations at the 36th Grammy Awards in 1994. Vandross' cover of the Bee Gees hit, "How Deep Is Your Love" was nominated for Best Male R&B Vocal Performance at the 36th Grammy Awards in March 1994. In addition, the album's first two singles "Little Miracles (Happen Every Day)" and "Heaven Knows" received nominations in the Best R&B Song category.

Track listing

Personnel 
 Luther Vandross – lead vocals, vocal arrangements 
 Marcus Miller – keyboards (1-7, 9), bass (1-8, 10), drum programming (1, 3, 5, 6, 7, 9), percussion programming (1, 3, 5, 6, 7, 9), music arrangements (1-7, 9), additional drum programming (2, 4), additional keyboards (8, 10), backing vocals (9)
 Jason Miles – sound programming (1-5, 8, 9)
 Philippe Saisse – acoustic piano (2), synthesizer (2), keyboard programming (2)
 Reed Vertelney – keyboard programming (2, 4), drum programming (2, 4), music arrangements (2, 4)
 Eric Persing – sound programming (3, 6, 7, 10)
 Hubert Eaves III – keyboard programming (8), music arrangements (8)
 Nat Adderley, Jr. – keyboards (10), music arrangements (10)
 Paul Jackson, Jr. – guitar
 Doc Powell – guitar (10)
 Ivan Hampden – drum fills (2)
 Michael White – cymbals (3)
 Kirk Whalum – saxophone solo (10)
 Joe Soldo – string contractor (10)
 Tawatha Agee – backing vocals
 Lisa Fischer – backing vocals (1, 3, 5)
 Cissy Houston – backing vocals
 Paulette McWilliams – backing vocals
 Cindy Mizelle – backing vocals (1, 3, 5, 9)
 Kevin Owens – backing vocals (1, 5)
 Tamira C. Sanders – backing vocals (1, 5, 9)
 Fonzi Thornton – backing vocals (1, 2, 3, 5, 6, 7, 9, 10), vocal contractor
 Brenda White-King – backing vocals 
 Phillip Ballou – backing vocals (2, 9)
 Michelle Cobbs – backing vocals (2)
 Myrna Smith-Schilling – backing vocals (7, 10)

Production 
 Marcus Miller – producer 
 Luther Vandross – producer
 Ray Bardani – engineer, mixing 
 Michael Morongell – engineer
 Shelly Yakus – engineer
 Bruce Roberts – recording (6)
 Steve Barncard – assistant engineer
 Bob Borbonus – assistant engineer
 Fred Bova – assistant engineer
 Thom Cadley – assistant engineer
 Jonathan Little – assistant engineer
 Gary Mannon – assistant engineer
 Gary Myerberg – assistant engineer
 Chad Munsey – assistant engineer
 Mark Tindle – assistant engineer
 Dave Collins – mastering at A&M Mastering Studios (Hollywood, California).
 Marsha Burns – production coordinator, manager 
 George Corsillo – art direction, design 
 Matthew Rolston – photography
 Hutaff Lennon – personal assistant
 Elijah Reeder – personal assistant 
 Billy Bass – manager
 Shep Gordon – manager
 Alive Enterprises, Inc. – management company

Charts

Weekly charts

Year-end charts

Certifications

References

1993 albums
Epic Records albums
Luther Vandross albums
Albums produced by Luther Vandross
Albums produced by Marcus Miller